The Japanese Imperial Army had divisional mixed brigades, which were the detachment of a brigade from an infantry division with various divisional support units or units attached from its corps or army. This provided a combined arms force of infantry, artillery, cavalry and other support units.

List of Japanese Imperial Army Mixed Brigades
Guards Mixed Brigade
2nd Guards Mixed Brigade (Japan)
 4th Mixed Brigade (Imperial Japanese Army) – Manchuria 1931–1932
 8th Mixed Brigade (Imperial Japanese Army) – Manchuria 1931–1932
 14th Mixed Brigade (Imperial Japanese Army) – Manchuria 1931–1932
 15th Mixed Brigade (Imperial Japanese Army)
 Katayama Detachment – Manchukuo 1939
 24th Mixed Brigade (Imperial Japanese Army) – Shanghai 1932
 33rd Mixed Brigade (Imperial Japanese Army) – China 1933
 39th Mixed Brigade (Imperial Japanese Army) – Manchuria 1931
 Karafuto Mixed Brigade (Imperial Japanese Army) – Sakhalin 1939 – February 1945 (reformed to 88th division)

See also
List of Japanese Infantry divisions
List of IJA Independent Mixed Brigades

References 

Japanese World War II brigades
World War II-related lists by country

ja:大日本帝国陸軍師団一覧